The 9th Air Wing is a wing of the Japan Air Self-Defense Force. It comes under the authority of the Southwestern Air Defense Force. It is based at Naha Air Base in Okinawa Prefecture. 

As of 2017 it has two squadrons, both equipped with Mitsubishi F-15J/DJ and Kawasaki T-4 aircraft:
 204th Tactical Fighter Squadron
 304th Tactical Fighter Squadron

Gallery

See also
 Fighter units of the Japan Air Self-Defense Force

References

Units of the Japan Air Self-Defense Force